JEF United Chiba Ladies, also known by their full name, is a Japanese women's football club that plays in the WE League.

Kits

Kit suppliers and shirt sponsors

Players

First-team squad

Type 2

Former players

Former notable players
 Karina Maruyama (2010–2011)
 Yuika Sugasawa (2013–2016)
 Erina Yamane (2012 – June 2017)

Club officials

Honours

Domestic
Empress's Cup
Runners-up (2): 2012, 2021
Nadeshiko League Cup
Champions (1): 2017
Runners-up (1): 2016

Season-by-season records

Transition of team name
JEF United Ichihara Ladies: 1992–2004
JEF United Chiba Ladies: 2005–present

See also
Japan Football Association (JFA)
List of women's football clubs in Japan
2022–23 in Japanese football

References

External links
 (in Japanese)

JEF United Chiba
Women's football clubs in Japan
1992 establishments in Japan
Japan Women's Football League teams
Sports teams in Chiba Prefecture
WE League clubs